The BK Fliers BK-1 is a single seat homebuilt aircraft.

Design and development
The Bk-1 was designed and built by Bruce King in 2004 after building a modified Hummel Bird. It was patterned after the Hummel Bird, with a full VW engine and larger cockpit and surfaces.

The BK-1 is an all-aluminum, monocoque/semi-monocoque, single-engine, low-wing airplane, with either conventional or tricycle landing gear. The BK-1.3 is a modified version, 30% larger than the original, with full-span flaperons.

Variants 
 BK-1:  Original version, originally with conventional landing gear
 BK-1.3: 30%-larger version, originally with tricycle gear

Specifications (BK-1)

See also

References

External links

 "BK1 Around the Pattern," (builder's demo flight video of conventional-gear BK-1), January 24, 2007, bkfliers.com
 "Building a Plane from Scratch," (news video: interview with BK-1 designer Bruce King and video of his tricycle-gear plane in demo flight), July 16, 2013, KSAT news
 BK Flier builder group

Homebuilt aircraft